Nine Mile Falls School District No. 325/179 is a public school district in the counties of Spokane and Stevens, Washington, USA and serves the communities of Nine Mile Falls and Suncrest.

Schools

High schools
Lakeside High School

Middle schools
Lakeside Middle School

Primary schools
Lake Spokane Elementary School
Nine Mile Falls Elementary School

References

External links
Nine Mile Falls School District No. 325/179
Lake Spokane Elementary School official website
Nine Mile Falls Elementary School official website
Nine Mile Falls School District Report Card

School districts in Washington (state)
Public school districts in Spokane County, Washington
Education in Stevens County, Washington